Martin Khor Kok Peng (November 9, 1951 – 1 April 2020) was the executive director of the South Centre, an intergovernmental organisation of developing countries based in Geneva, from 1 March 2009 to 2018. He replaced Dr. Yash Tandon who was the executive director of the South Centre from 2005 to 2009. Khor was also a journalist, economist and the former Director of the Third World Network, which is based in Penang, Malaysia.

Khor was born in Penang, Malaysia. He was active in the civil society movement.
He attended the 1999 and 2000 World Economic Forum (WEF) in Davos, the World Social Forum (WSF 2002, 2003) and the European social forum (2004).

He was also a member of the UN Secretary-General's Task Force on Environment and Human Settlements since 1997,  and a member of the Ministry of International Trade and Industry's National Committee on Multilateral Trade Issues in Malaysia. He was a Vice-Chair of  the Working Group of Experts on the Right to Development under the UN  Commission on Human Rights.

He took part in the Helsinki Process on Globalisation and Democracy.

Khor sat on the board of directors of the International Forum on Globalization.

Khor was a columnist for The Star from 1978 to 2019.

He studied at Cambridge University and the Universiti Sains of Malaysia. He was an economist there.

Illness and death
Khor had been fighting cancer since 2015, and he had returned to Penang to fight it. He died on April 1, 2020. His wake was held at the funeral parlor at Mount Erskine on the following day and his funeral was held on April 2nd at the same location. He had a daughter and a wife. Datuk Seri Mohamad Hasan paid tribute to him.

Quotes 
about the WSF: "That is a new global relationship between countries that promote the weak rather than the strong"
WSF 2003
about the patent system and intellectual property in general: "One of the solutions is finding ways to promote innovation and to reward good work without necessarily using the intellectual property system, because it may not be the right system to provide rewards all the time."
Scenarios for the future

Selected works
The Malaysian Experience in Financial-Economic Crisis Management: An Alternative to the IMF-Style Approach (2005)  983-2729-40-8 (Publisher: Third World Network)
Global Trends Series (2001-2019)  978-1842770559  All articles on series from 2003-2019 on Third World Network  (Publishers: Zed Books and Third World Network)

References

External links
 interview

1951 births
Malaysian people of Chinese descent
Malaysian economists
Malaysian journalists
People from Penang
2020 deaths